The British Rail Class 114 diesel multiple units were built by BR Derby from September 1956 to July 1957. Forty-nine 2-car units were built, numbered E50001-49 for driving motors (later renumbered 53001-49) and E56001-49 for driving trailers (later renumbered 54001-49). The units were used in the early days out of 40A Lincoln TMD (LN) on services all over the county, although a small number were transferred to 41A Sheffield (Darnall) during 1959/60. 

The vehicles were the first type to be built at Derby with the longer 63 ft 6 in underframe, and the first Derby vehicles to be built from steel. This design would be re-used in the 116 and 117. The type was classed a heavyweight unit; with their original 150 hp BUT engines, they were found to be underpowered for the local scheduled services, and lost time especially when towing a van (which was a regular occurrence in that area). The most problematic stretch was the 1 in 122 for just under a mile near Ancaster which reduced these units to 45 mph even on full power. As a result of this, several 3-car formations were put together using two power cars and one trailer. The type was re-engined with Leyland Albion 230 bhp motors. 

These were used in the main on Grantham - Boston/Skegness and Lincoln - Cleethorpes workings during 1957, and would be a familiar sight in the Lincolnshire area until the early 1990s.

Formations
Formations noted in Railway Observer magazine were E50008/E50007/E56007, E50011/E50012/E56012, E50038/E50039/E56015 and E50015/E50035/E56035. Spare trailers were stored at various locations - E56016/25/40 at Blankney & Metheringham, E56010/39 at Bardney and E56004/20/22/37/38/44/45 near Sleaford South Junction. 

E50029/30/31/32/33/34 and their respective trailers were transferred to Stratford between February and April 1957 in exchange for Derby 2-car lightweight units, but between June and October the 114s moved back to Lincoln.

History
E50049/E56049 was introduced with 230 hp versions of the power unit, which proved to have a much more acceptable power to weight ratio, and during 1959 and 1960 all the class were fitted with these more powerful engines and settled down to work most Lincolnshire local services (with regular visits to South Yorkshire and Nottinghamshire) for over 25 years.
One of the class (one of the cars 50040) along with another 3-car unit was on one of the last passenger service from Louth to Grimsby on 20 December 1980. Other services where Cleethorpes to Barton-upon-Humber, Cleethorpes to Sheffield via Retford, and Peterborough to Grimsby via Boston, Willoughby and Louth.

The units were rarely seen outside of their normal working area, but in June 1957 E50029/E56029 worked a special excursion from Ipswich to Chessington South. 

Later in their life, they were moved to the Tyseley TMD (TS) West Midlands, but still came back to the Lincolnshire area on a regular basis.

Accidents and incidents
 On 25 January 1963, a set working the Grantham - Lincoln Central service collided with the rear (tender) of a stationary Class B1 steam locomotive near Bracebridge Gas Sidings Signalbox near Lincoln. Two people were killed and three injured.
 On 12 February 1968, the 06:48 Sheffield - Cleethorpes was hit in the rear by a coal train ran. The Class 114 had a parcel van as a tail load which took the force of the impact, but the rear cab was still severely crushed.
 On 28 November 1969, 50031 + 56031 ran through level crossing gates at Great Coates level crossing near Grimsby, striking a Dodge articulated lorry and carrying it 46 feet into the station. 3 people needed hospital treatment. The driver had run a red signal.
 On 28 January 1970, 56020 & 50020, travelling at 50mph, struck a tanker traversing Dowdyke Bank level crossing between Spalding & Boston.
 On 9 December 1983, 53049 + 54049 working the 17:32 Cleethorpes - Sheffield collided with the 15:02 Drax - Lindsey (900-tons of empty oil tanks hauled by 47299) at Wrawby junction, a convergence of lines just outside Barnetby, Lincolnshire. One passenger was killed.
 On the 26th July 1986, 53016 + 54034, coupled to Class 105 54434 + 51278, collided with a van that had driven onto Lockington Level Crossing against flashing lights. 54434 derailed and ran down the embankment, turning 180 degrees before coming to rest on its side. All vehicles were badly damaged. Nine people were killed.

Prototype unit
In addition to the 49 production units, a fiftieth two-car unit (cars 50000 and 56000) was built to test the Rolls-Royce engine type and hydraulic transmission later used on the Class 127 units. Initially the unit underwent trials on the Cockermouth, Keswick and Penrith railway in early 1957, but was subsequently also allocated to Lincoln and worked the same diagrams as the other 49.  The unit was withdrawn in October 1967 as it was deemed to be non-standard, thus never received an official TOPS class designation.

Withdrawal
The units were replaced by newer "Sprinter" units in the late 1980s. By 1992, only two units were still in service, based at Tyseley depot in Birmingham, and all were withdrawn by July of that year. The final set, T027, was eventually preserved at Midland Railway Centre, Butterley.

Non-passenger use

Five units were rebuilt as parcels units with roller-shutter doors in 1988. These were repainted in Royal Mail red livery, and were based at Cambridge depot. They were withdrawn in 1991. Four of the units were scrapped, whilst the fifth was rebuilt as a test train for the new ATP. This unit passed into EWS ownership with the privatisation of Britain's railways. It was then used in a new role of a route-learner unit, until it was withdrawn in 2002. It was eventually preserved in 2004.

Parcels cars - converted in 1986 

All were allocated to CA. Initially only the seats were removed, although later a more substantial conversion was carried out, including the fitting of roller shutter doors, with two sets of these on the DTCs where the vestibules/passenger doors had been.

Departmental

ADB 977775/6 were converted into an Automatic Train Protection demonstration train and fitted with both types of ATP systems from the BR pilot schemes c1991. Following the abandonment of ATP development, the unit found a new lease of life with EWS as a route learning and inspection saloon based initially at Margam South Wales.

Preservation

Only two sets have been preserved on heritage railways.

Notable appearances in media
E50009 features in the 1959 British Railways training film The diesel train driver, part 2 - Driving the train

References

Sources
Motive Power Recognition: 3 DMUs. Colin J. Marsden
British Railway Pictorial: First Generation DMUs. Kevin Robertson
British Rail Fleet Survey 8: Diesel Multiple Units- The First Generation. Brian Haresnape
A Pictorial Record of British Railways Diesel Multiple Units. Brian Golding

External links

Midland Railway Trust Railcar Group - owners of units 50019+56006 and 56015+50015.
The Railcar Association

114
Train-related introductions in 1960